Mónica Oltra Jarque is a Spanish left-wing politician, and the ex-vice president, ex-spokesperson and ex-minister for Equality and Inclusive Policies of the Valencian government.

Born in Germany to a Spanish immigrants family, she returned to Spain in 1984 and shortly after joined the Communist Party of Spain.

Mónica Oltra has served as one of the main leaders of political party Valencian People's Initiative (IdPV) and of Coalició Compromís (Commitment Coalition), a coalition which she has represented in the Valencian parliament, representing the province of Valencia since 2007 until her resignation in 2022. She holds a bachelor's degree in Law from the University of Valencia. Alongside being a politician, she also works as a lawyer.

Despite the pressure, she initially refused to resign her position of the vice-president of Valencian government. However, after PSOE-Valencia threatened to break the governing Botanic coalition, she resigned on June 21.

Notes

References 

1969 births
21st-century Spanish women politicians
Coalició Compromís politicians
Living people
University of Valencia alumni
Vice Presidents of the Valencian Community
Members of the 7th Corts Valencianes
Members of the 8th Corts Valencianes
Members of the 9th Corts Valencianes
Members of the 10th Corts Valencianes